Pyasi Atma is a 1998 Indian Hindi-language horror film directed by P Chandrakumar and produced by Gautam Dhariwal, starring Prithvi, Shiva, Kishore Bhanushali, Dinesh Hingoo and Mithun Chakraborty.

Plot
Pyasi Atma is a horror film starring Prithvi in lead role and Mithun Chakraborty playing a guest role.

Cast
 Mithun Chakraborty ( Guest Appearance )
 Shiva Rindani
 Prithvi
 Kishore Bhanushali
 Dolly Bindra
 Shiva Rindani
 Dinesh Hingoo
 Jay Thakur

References

External links
 

1998 films
1990s Hindi-language films
Mithun's Dream Factory films
Films shot in Ooty
Indian horror films
Indian erotic horror films
Films directed by P. Chandrakumar